Ja'Mal Green is an American community activist, actor, and politician from Chicago, Illinois. He was an unsuccessful candidate for Mayor of Chicago in 2019 and 2023.

News reports have described Green as a Black Lives Matter activist.

Biography
Born in 1995, Green grew up in the Englewood, Gresham and Beverly neighborhoods of Chicago.

In 2016, Green served as the official surrogate for Bernie Sanders 2016 presidential campaign. In the same year, he was arrested along with 19 others at the Taste of Chicago, where an anti-police brutality event was being organized.

In 2018, he along with his team founded Majostee Allstars, an urban center which provides guidance and training to underprivileged youth.

During the COVID-19 pandemic, Green created Mobile Nail Salon.

In June 2020, Green started protesting along with other activists against Chase Bank's loan policy and demanded to retain and implement Community Reinvestment Act. On June 3, 2020, WBEZ published a report in which it was written that, in over a six year period, Chase Bank only handed out 1.9 percent of total loans to black-majority neighborhoods. Due to his persistent protests, he was banned from entering Chase Bank branches in July 2020.

In July 2020, he created The Small Business Repair Program along with David Doig to help black-owned businesses which were affected due to looting. The amount for the program was raised through donations.

Green became well-known after his activism surrounding the Laquan McDonald case. In February 2022, he was again arrested for taking part in a protest which was demanding the arrest of a police officer named Jason Van Dyke for his murder of Laquan McDonald.

He is also the founder of an organization called My Turn to Own.

In June 2022 Green announced that he intended to run for Mayor of Chicago again on a platform focused on public safety, modernizing city government, economic development, and climate change. Green filed petitions to be on the ballot for the 2023 Chicago Municipal election in December of 2022 and won a lottery to be the first candidate listed on the ballot. In the initial round of the election, Green was defeated, placing sixth of nine candidates with 12,239 votes (2.17% of the election's overall vote).

Books
 Class Clown: Three Strikes But Not Out (2014)

Filmography
 Of Boys and Men (2008)
 It Takes a Village (2009)
 Reggie Yates: Life and Death in Chicago Film (2016)

Electoral history

References

External links
 
 

1995 births
Living people
Black Lives Matter people
Illinois Democrats
African-American people in Illinois politics
Activists from Chicago